Van Dyke Public Schools is a school district based in Warren, Michigan. It serves parts of Warren and a small portion of Center Line.

Schools

Secondary schools
 Lincoln High School
 Lincoln Middle School

Elementary schools
 Lincoln Elementary School
 Carlson Elementary School
 McKinley Elementary School

Former schools
 Washington Elementary School
 John F.Kennedy Elementary School
 Harding Elementary School
 Elizabeth Little Elementary School 
 Wolcott Junior High School
 Thompson Elementary School
 Kramer Elementary School
 Macomb Park Elementary

Childhood Center
John F.Kennedy Early Childhood Center

References

External links

 

School districts in Michigan
Education in Macomb County, Michigan
Warren, Michigan